Iron Felix or Iron Feliks may refer to one of the following

Felix Edmundovich Dzerzhinsky.
Monument to Felix Dzerzhinsky, Moscow
Pinwheel calculator Feliks.